Stopera is a surname. Notable people with the surname include:

Andrew Stopera (born 1997), American curler
Bill Stopera (born 1968), American curler 
Matt Stopera, American journalist